Portland City Hall may refer to:

Portland City Hall (Maine)
Portland City Hall (Oregon)

Architectural disambiguation pages